Fryston Colliery Welfare F.C. was an English football club based in Fryston village, West Yorkshire.

History
The team participated in the Yorkshire Football League, Northern Counties East League and Central Midlands League, as well as the FA Vase.

References

Defunct football clubs in England
Defunct football clubs in West Yorkshire
Sport in Castleford
Association football clubs disestablished in 2002
2002 disestablishments in England
Yorkshire Combination
Yorkshire Football League
Central Midlands Football League
Mining association football teams in England